La sargento Matacho is a 2017 Colombian drama film directed by William Gonzalez and starring Fabiana Medina, Damián Alcázar, Marlon Moreno and Juan Pablo Barragán. It is inspired by historical events such as La Violencia.

The film was shown on October 11, 2017 at the 7º Almeria Western Film Festival.

Cast

References

External links 

 
 

Films shot in Colombia
Films set in 1948
Colombian drama films
2015 drama films
2015 films
La Violencia
2010s Colombian films